In mathematics, an -algebra in a symmetric monoidal infinity category C consists of the following data:
An object  for any open subset U of Rn homeomorphic to an n-disk.
A multiplication map:

for any disjoint open disks  contained in some open disk V
subject to the requirements that the multiplication maps are compatible with composition, and that  is an equivalence if .  An equivalent definition is that A is an algebra in C over the little n-disks operad.

Examples 
 An -algebra in vector spaces over a field is a unital associative algebra if n = 1, and a unital commutative associative algebra if n ≥ 2.
 An -algebra in categories is a monoidal category if n = 1 , a braided monoidal category if n = 2, and a symmetric monoidal category if n ≥ 3.
 If Λ is a commutative ring, then  defines an -algebra in the infinity category of chain complexes of -modules.

See also 
Categorical ring

References 
http://www.math.harvard.edu/~lurie/282ynotes/LectureXXII-En.pdf
http://www.math.harvard.edu/~lurie/282ynotes/LectureXXIII-Koszul.pdf

External links 
http://ncatlab.org/nlab/show/En-algebra

Higher category theory
Homotopy theory